Badland is a 2019 American Western film set more than a decade after the American Civil War. Written and directed by Justin Lee, it depicts a Pinkerton detective who has been sent west to find several men who committed atrocious acts during the Civil War.

Plot
Pinkerton detective Matthias Breecher (Kevin Makely) is hired by one of the first African American senators to track down the worst of the Confederate war criminals. He first shoots and kills former confederate General Corbin Dandridge, in the General's Mississippi barn.

Breecher then travels west, seeking his next target, Reginald Cooke (Bruce Dern). Along the way, he encounters bounty hunter Harlan Red (Wes Studi), who states that they will one day come into conflict. Breecher finds Cooke on his farm and learns that Reginald is being cared for by his daughter, Sarah (Mira Sorvino) as he is dying of pneumonia. Breecher decides to neither shoot nor hang Cooke, but to stay at his homestead until he passes away from the disease. During his stay, he becomes close to Sarah.

Breecher travels to see a neighboring landowner, Fred Quaid (James Russo). He offers Quaid money to stop threatening the Cookes in order to sell their land to him. Quaid offers to leave them alone if Breecher can beat Quaid's best man in a fist fight. Breecher accepts and wins the fight, then returns to the Cooke's homestead. The next day however, Quaid and several men attack the Cooke homestead. Breecher and Sarah Cooke hold them off. Reginald steps outside with a gun to help, and is shot by Quaid, who is in turn shot by Breecher. After building a coffin for Reginald and helping Sarah bury him, Breecher heads west to New Mexico in search of Huxley Wainwright (Jeff Fahey).

Staying at a hotel and saloon, Breecher encounters now Sheriff Wainwright after a gunfight inside the saloon. Wainright is suspicious of newcomers since he stopped receiving letters from Dandridge, and has Breecher grabbed and tied to a chair early the next morning. Wainwright discovers that Breecher is a detective after seeing his badge and the warrants Breecher carries. He has Breecher waterboarded and knocked out, then instructs two of his men to bury him alive outside of town.

Breecher regains consciousness as Wainwright's men are digging his grave and makes his escape, killing both of them. He stumbles to the local church, where he finds the bartender from the saloon (Amanda Wyss) and gives her a message to wire to his patron, Senator Benjamin Burke (Tony Todd). Burke responds that Breecher should use his own discretion and proceed "by any means necessary."

After giving a letter addressed to Sarah Cooke to the bartender, Breecher instructs her to hide until the fighting is over and leaves the church. He marches to the saloon and engages in a gunfight with Wainwright's men, which he wins. Wainwright is drawn out, and challenges Breecher to a showdown in which they are both shot. Breecher survives his injury, retrieves Wainwright's Sheriff's badge and departs town, later collapsing in a grove.

Harlan Red finds him and bandages his wounds. In thanks, Breecher tells Red where to find Wainwright's body, to collect the bounty. Breecher continues on, eventually reaching the Cooke homestead, where he finds Sarah.

Cast
 Kevin Makely as Matthias Breecher
 Mira Sorvino as Sarah Cooke
 Bruce Dern as Reginald Cooke
 Wes Studi as Harlan Red
 Trace Adkins as General Corbin Dandridge
 James Russo as Fred Quaid
 Jeff Fahey as Huxley Wainwright
 Amanda Wyss as Alice Hollenbeck
 Tony Todd as Senator Benjamin Burke
 Music by Jared Forman

Production
Filming took place on location in Santa Clarita, California at the Veluzat Movie ranch. Lee had watched the 2017 revisionist western Hostiles (film) and felt inspired, but also began reminiscing about films he watched with his grandparents and was inspired "to write something as a throwback to those types of movies but not make something 'corny' in a way. Something with heavy drama but still maintaining those old traditions and tropes of the 60s and 70s".

Reception
Joe Leydon in Variety (magazine) said "Justin Lee's indie Western should satisfy genre enthusiasts with a strong cast and an entertaining spin on a familiar story."

References

External links 
 
 

2019 films
American Western (genre) films
2010s American films